Robert Weiss or Weiß may refer to:

 Bob Weiss (born 1942), American basketball coach and former player
 Rob Weiss (fl. 1993), American television and film producer, screenwriter, actor and director
 Robert Weiss (choreographer) (fl. 1977), American ballet dancer, choreographer and artistic director
 Robert Weiss (therapist) (born ), American author and therapist specializing in sex addiction
 Robert A. Weiss (fl. 1978), American dermatologist
 Robert K. Weiss (fl. 1977–2014), American film producer
 Robert Weiß (pilot) (1920–1944), German World War II fighter ace
 Roberto Weiss (1906–1969), Italian-British historian of Renaissance culture